The 2014–15 Louisiana–Lafayette Ragin' Cajuns men's basketball team represented the University of Louisiana at Lafayette during the 2014–15 NCAA Division I men's basketball season. The Ragin' Cajuns, led by fifth year head coach Bob Marlin, played their home games at the Cajundome and were members of the Sun Belt Conference. They finished the season 22–14, 13–7 in Sun Belt play to finish in fourth place. They advanced to the semifinals of the Sun Belt tournament where they lost to Georgia State. They were invited to the CollegeInsider.com Tournament where they defeated Incarnate Word in the first round and Sam Houston State in the second round before losing in the quarterfinals to Evansville.

Roster

Schedule

|-
!colspan=12 style="background:#E34234; color:#FFFFFF;"| Exhibition

|-
!colspan=9 style="background:#E34234; color:#FFFFFF;"| Regular season

|-
!colspan=12 style="background:#E34234; color:#FFFFFF;"|Sun Belt tournament

|-
!colspan=12 style="background:#E34234; color:#FFFFFF;"|CIT

References

Louisiana Ragin' Cajuns men's basketball seasons
Louisiana-Lafayette
Louisiana-Lafayette
Louisiana
Louisiana